José Matos Martins dos Reis (born 12 September 1911, date of death unknown) was a Portuguese footballer who played as goalkeeper.

Football career 
Reis gained 1 cap for Portugal against Germany 27 February 1936 in Lisbon, in a 1-3 defeat.

External links 
 
 

1911 births
People from Loulé
Year of death missing
Portuguese footballers
Association football goalkeepers
Primeira Liga players
C.F. Os Belenenses players
Portugal international footballers
Sportspeople from Faro District